Kristine Zhenie Lobrigas Tandingan-Monterde (born March 11, 1992), mononymously known as KZ, is a Filipina singer and television personality. She rose to prominence following her win on the first season of The X Factor Philippines in 2012.

Known for her distinct soulful voice, she became an influence to younger singers in the Philippines, she has released notable songs such as  "Mahal Ko o Mahal Ako" and "Two Less Lonely People in the World", which peaked at #2 on the Philippine Hot 100.

Currently, Tandingan is a coach on the Philippine version of the singing competition The Voice Kids. Tandingan also notably joined  HBS' Singer 2018, where she faced off and won against eventual winner Jessie J on one episode.

Life and career

Early life
KZ Tandingan started singing as a child but had to stop when she was in her junior year in high school after suffering from a throat problem. She is an alumna of University of Southeastern Philippines in Davao City and had graduated with a degree of Bachelor of Science in Biology.

Before she joined The X Factor Philippines, Tandingan was part of a local acoustic band.

2012: The X Factor Philippines
Tandingan was considered an early favorite after she performed a jazzy version of "Somewhere Over the Rainbow" in the fourth week of the Judges' auditions. After receiving a standing ovation from all the judges, she was requested to sing again. Tandingan obliged and sang "Ready or Not" by American hip-hop group, The Fugees. With her second song, she also showed her rapping skills. Tandingan was greatly praised by all of the judges. Nievera even shouted, "A star is born in Digos!". The video of Tandingan's audition went viral online after it was uploaded in YouTube. The video reached nearly 1 million views before it was removed due to copyright issues. During the Bootcamp stage, she sang "Mahirap Magmahal ng Syota ng Iba" by the APO Hiking Society and cried after she made the cut for the Top 20. Tandingan sang "Killing Me Softly with His Song" by Roberta Flack during the Judges' home visit. On week 9, she landed on the bottom 2 for the first time with teammate Allen Sta. Maria, but she survived elimination. Tandingan was Charice's last remaining act after Allen Sta. Maria was eliminated on week 9. She reached the grand finals on October 7, 2012, and was proclaimed the winner of The X Factor Philippines.

Performances and results

2012–present: post The X Factor
On January 7, 2013, Tandingan entered the Himig Handog contest with the song entry called "Scared To Death", written by Domingo Rosco Jr. The song was accompanied with a music video that was assigned as a project to be directed by University of Santo Tomas and premiered on February 2 in Myx Philippines. She performed the song in the grand finals on February 24, 2013 at the SM Mall of Asia Arena. Overall, the song finished in 4th place and was the third runner-up for Best P-pop Love Song thus rewarding the writer of Tandingan's song one hundred thousand pesos in cash. On April 21, 2013, she toured across North America as a supporting act for pop band Side A. On May 2, 2013, Tandingan released her self-titled debut album. The album was produced by Jonathan Manalo and consists of mainly original songs with some covers. On June 27, 2013, she officially launched the album on Makati City.

On January 11, 2014, Tandingan won ₱1,000,000 in The Singing Bee where she accumulated 4 straight songs correctly. In the show, she did not make a single error in the first 2 rounds and eventually won a tie-breaker against co-contestants Frenchie Dy and Sitti, who also did not commit any errors throughout the game. The following year, she was announced as one of the eight contestants for the second season of Your Face Sounds Familiar along with Myrtle Sarrosa, Sam Concepcion, Cacai Bautista, Kean Cipriano, Denise Laurel, Michael Pangilinan and Eric Nicolas. The show ran from September 12, 2015 to December 13, 2015. and she was the 3rd runner-up. Tandingan was then announced as one of the celebrity mentors in We Love OPM in 2016, being the mentor of Team O Diva. The show ran from May 14, 2016 to July 17, 2016. She is currently seen in ASAP, as one of the ASAP Soul Sessions with Jason Dy, Daryl Ong, Jay R and Kyla. The Soul Sessions formed on May 15, 2016, and disbanded in late 2017.

Singer 2018
On February 9, 2018, Tandingan competed as a weekly challenger on China's Singer 2018 wherein she placed first on her debut round on week five. She sang her own rendition of Adele's "Rolling in the Deep". She remained as a contestant on the show until her elimination on week nine.

On February 16, 2018, Tandingan sang the Mandopop song in her own rendition, "The Hurts You Never Knew" (Chinese: 你不知道的痛), a combination of three pieces of songs "What Else Do You Want From Me"(Chinese:你還要我怎樣) by Joker Xue, "All The Things You Never Knew" (Chinese:你不知道的事) by Wang Leehom and "Still Aching" (Chinese:還隱隱作痛) by Power Station. She was allowed to remain in the competition for ranking third in the top four, per the competition rules for a challenger.

On March 16, 2018, Tandingan sang "Royals" where she was the third person to perform. That week was a double elimination (after one contestant was too ill to perform and was given bye that week), and per the competition rules the two singers receiving the lowest count of overall votes would be eliminated. She finished last on the overall votes, which resulted in her elimination of Singer 2018 (another contestant, James Li, was also eliminated for finishing 7th on the overall count after a challenger of the week successfully placed in the top four).

Tandingan's stint in the show had made international music fans noticed her unique and creative musical artistry in the different music genre. Her eventual elimination created a flurry of criticism from social media commentators and the Chinese fans she has built during her short stint in the show. On Weibo, China's equivalent of Twitter, KZ Tandingan became the second most talked about a topic after her elimination.

As a rule, however, all eliminated singers except singers who withdrew and singer in the first round returned for the breakout episode (aired April 6, 2018) for a chance to re-enter Singer 2018 and qualify for the grand finals. Tandingan performed a Tagalog/Mandarin rendition of Anak and finished 7th, and was unable to advance to the finals. Despite her elimination, she later returned as a guest singer (along with former winner Coco Lee) for a performance from Jessie J (who was the series winner) in the grand finals aired April 13, 2018.

DIVAS
On April 27, 2016, KZ was announced to be part of the DIVAS girl group along with Kyla, Yeng Constantino, and Angeline Quinto (Rachelle Ann Go was originally planned to be part of the group, but left due to international commitments). The group staged their first concert titled DIVAS Live in Manila on November 11, 2016 at the Smart Araneta Coliseum. On December 15, 2018, the group staged their second major concert at the Smart Araneta Coliseum with Boyz II Men titled Boyz II Men with DIVAS.

Concerts and tours

2016
On April 27, 2016, it was announced that a girl group named DIVAS, composed of Tandingan, Yeng Constantino, Kyla, Rachelle Ann Go and Angeline Quinto would debut with their first concert at the Smart Araneta Coliseum titled DIVAS: Live in Manila on November 11, 2016. However, Go left the group due to scheduling problems.

2018
KZ held her first major solo concert Supreme: KZ Tandingan at Mall of Asia Arena on June 22, 2018. She shared the stage with some of the biggest artists in Philippines, including fellow ASAP Soul Sessionists Kyla, Jason Dy and Daryl Ong, her biggest rap influence Gloc-9, Malaya hitmaker Moira Dela Torre, singer Iñigo Pascual, and rapper Shanti Dope. Shen then embarked on her first world tour, the "Supreme: World Tour".

On October 31, 2018, KZ returned to the MOA Arena Stage, this time performing alongside Chinese singers Fish Leong, A-Lin, Faye at the PDMN "To Youth Nice To Meet You" Phil-Chi Star Concert.

On December 15, DIVAS returned to the Araneta Coliseum, staging a collaboration concert with the international R&B vocal trio Boyz II Men.

Discography

Studio albums

Singles

Filmography

Television

Films

Notes

  The table above only includes Tandingan's significant appearances, therefore guest appearances are not included.

Awards

References

External links

Living people
1992 births
21st-century Filipino singers
21st-century Filipino women singers
Filipino women pop singers
Mandarin-language singers
Singers from Davao del Sur
Star Magic
Star Music artists
The X Factor Philippines
The X Factor winners